Granville Gulf Reservation protects   on either side of a six-mile section of Vermont Route 100 in Granville, Vermont. The area is managed by the Vermont Department of Forests, Parks, and Recreation and traverses the Granville Notch.

The land extends about 7 mi (11 km) along the streams, from the border of Addison County with Washington County south to about a mile north of the town of Granville. It includes the 80-foot Moss Glen Falls, which is visited by a short walk off Route 100. The Moss Glen Falls Natural Area is a 5-acre state-designated Natural Area.

A 20-acre old-growth stand of red spruce and hemlock has been designated as the Granville Gulf Spruce-Hemlock Stand, a State Natural Area.

History
In 1928, former governor Redfield Proctor Jr. donated the first 900 acres of the site to the state. Additional purchases were made in 1942 and 1952.

References

External links
Official website

Vermont state forests
Protected areas of Addison County, Vermont
Granville, Vermont